The West Lake Fire Department is a volunteer fire department located in Millcreek Township, Erie County, Pennsylvania. The department, which is one of four volunteer fire departments in the township, provides fire protection and emergency medical services from its two fire stations. Founded in 1937, the department is also the oldest in Millcreek.

Operations

Water Rescue
The response are for the West Lake Fire Department contains Lake Erie and Presque Isle Bay. As such the department operates a water rescue team that focuses on open water rescue, swift water rescue and ice rescue utilizing 3 boats. Rescue 486 is a 2007 Husky airboat capable of traveling over both ice and water, Rescue 498 is a 2014 Zodiac inflatable boat and Rescue 497 is a 2018 7.1 Meter Sealegs Amphibious Boat.

Stations and apparatus 
 this is the list of apparatus in use by the department:

References 

Fire departments in Pennsylvania
Fire